The 2022 Jersey Cricket World Cup Challenge League B was the third and final round of matches in Group B of the 2019–2022 ICC Cricket World Cup Challenge League, a cricket tournament which forms part of the qualification pathway to the 2023 Cricket World Cup. Originally, the tournament was scheduled to take place in Jersey in September 2021, but it was rescheduled to take place in Hong Kong due to the COVID-19 pandemic. After a further postponement, in February 2022, the tournament was rescheduled to be played in Jersey in August 2022. This was the first senior international tournament hosted in Jersey since the 2016 ICC World Cricket League Division Five.

With three games remaining, Hong Kong were one point ahead of Jersey and Uganda at the top of the group table. On 10 August 2022, Jersey defeated Hong Kong by 7 wickets to replace them at the top of the table with two rounds of games remaining. On the same day, a loss to Kenya left the Ugandans in third place, two points behind Jersey and one point behind Hong Kong. A comfortable win for Jersey in the penultimate round of matches left them with a two-point advantage over Uganda and a superior net run rate going into the final day. Jersey were confirmed as winners of Challenge League B despite losing their final game against Kenya.

On 14 August 2022, Jersey won Challenge League B ahead of Uganda on net run rate. Jersey progressed to the 2023 ICC Cricket World Cup Qualifier Play-off where, barring changes to the ICC's previous announcements, they would play their first official One Day International matches.

Squads
The following squads were named for the tournament.

On 18 July 2022, Zeko Burgess replaced Delray Rawlins in Bermuda's squad.

Fixtures

References

External links
 Series home at ESPN Cricinfo

International cricket competitions in Jersey
International cricket competitions in 2022
Jersey Cricket World Cup Challenge League B